Kondryayevo is a rural locality (a village) in Moshokskoye Rural Settlement, Sudogodsky District, Vladimir Oblast, Russia. The population was 403 as of 2010. There are 4 streets.

Geography 
Kondryayevo is located 45 km southeast of Sudogda (the district's administrative centre) by road. Nikolskoye is the nearest rural locality.

References 

Rural localities in Sudogodsky District
Sudogodsky Uyezd